Below is a partial list of shows that were previously aired in Studio 23, a defunct Philippine television network.

For the final shows on ABS-CBN Sports and Action, see List of programs broadcast by ABS-CBN Sports and Action.

Local defunct shows

 6underground Live & Raw
 The 700 Club Asia (2003–2006)
 Agri Business: How It Works (2013–2014)
 ANC Presents: Harapan 2013 (2013)
 Ang Boyfriend Ko
 Ano bang Trip Mo?
 Asenso Pinoy (2013–2014)
 Asian Formula 3
 Auto Extreme
 Badminton TV
 Balitang Bayan: Halalan 2013 (2013)
 Barkada Nights
 Barkada Nights Plus
 Barkada Trip (2004–2009)
 Behind the Brand: The Philippine Fashion Week TV
 Belo Beauty 101 (2008–2009)
 Bilis Balita (2011–2014)
 Bites & Beyond
 Biyeheng Bulilit
 BKTV
 BLOG (Barkada Log)
 The Bottomline with Boy Abunda
 Breakfast (1999–2007)
 Career Jam: Served with Bread n' Butter
 Channel Club Kids
 Chef's On The Go
 Chismix
 Chooks to Go Sayaw Fever: The Php 1M Chicken Dance Showdown
 Citiline (2001–2003)
 The Cory Quirino Show
 Crissa Digital Dance Synergy Year 8 (2013)
 Da Adventures of Pedro Penduko and  Pedro Penduko at ang mga Engkantao
 Digital Photo Plus
 Digital Tour (1999–2007)
 Dos Por Dos (2010–2012)
 Dream Date
 3oW PoWHz (Eow Powhz - Hello Po) (2010–2011)
 EsKWELAHAN ni Ryan Bang (2011–2013)
 ETZ (Eco Travel Zone) (2010–2011)
 Everybody Can Cook
 F! (2004–2006)
 Family Rosary Crusade (1996–2014)
 Field Trip
 Filipino Poker Tour
 FPJ: Ang Nagiisang Alamat  (also as FPJ: Hari ng Pelikula) (2012 as Barkada Nights: FPJ sa Studio 23; 2013–2014)
 Friends Again (2008–2014)
 Gag Ito! (2006–2007)
 Gag U! (2012–2014)
 Gameday Weekend with Rexona (2013)
 Gameplan (1999–2007)
 Generation RX
 The Good Life with Cory Quirino
 Good Times with Mo
 Gourmet Everyday
 Guide To Urban Living (2000–2002) (formerly ABS-CBN from 1960–1972)
 Gusto Ko Maging Beauty Queen
 Hardcore Brothers Easy Ride
 Healing Mass for the Homebound with Fr. Mario Sobrejuanite (produced by Rivers of Living Water (now ACTS) Catholic Community) (2008–2012) (moved to CNN Philippines)
 Health Republic
 Hotwire
 I Got It! (2010–2013)
 Iba-Balita Ngayon (2011–2012)
 Iba-Balita ni Anthony Taberna (2010–2014)
 Idol (ALA Promotions) (2013)
 In Fitness & In Health
 It's A Guy Thing
 It's Showtime (2012) (simulcast from ABS-CBN)
 Jeepney TV (2013–2014) (discontinued; now broadcast on 24/7 cable)
 Abangan Ang Susunod Na Kabanata 
 Arriba, Arriba!
 Bida si Mister, Bida si Misis
 Chika Chika Chicks
 Goin' Bananas
 Home Along Da Riles
 OK Fine Whatever
 Oki Doki Doc
 Pwedeng Pwede
 Super Laff-In
 Whattamen
 Jobs TV
 K-High (2010–2013)
 Kabarkada, Break The Bank (2007)
 Kidz Rule (2005–2009)
 Kiss The Cook (2007–2008)
 Lactacyd CofiDance Hip-Hop Challenge (2010)
 Lactacyd CofiDance Mash-Up (2011)
 Lactacyd Confidence Confidance Mash-Up 2012 (2012)
 Life Without Borders with Cory Quirino
 Look Who's Cooking
 Lunch Box Office
 M. U. on Studio 23 (2011)
 Man and Machine (2008–2009)
 Mano-Mano ni Anthony Taberna (2012–2013)
 Mashita Masarap
 Math-Tinik
 Melason: In Love & Promdi Heart (2009)
 Men's Room
 MOG TV
 Moms on the Go
 My Girl: One More Time
 MTV Asia (1996–2001)
 Myx (2001–2014) (discontinued; now broadcast on 24/7 cable, and ABS-CBN TV Plus on July 30, 2018)
 NCAA Games (Basketball & Volleyball) (2002–2011)
 News 23 (1996–1998)
 News Bites (1999–2010)
 News Central (1998–2010)
 News Central Morning Edition (2005–2006)
 Nginiiig: Paranormal Investigation
 O Shopping (2013–2014) (discontinued; now defunct)
 On CAM: Kabalikat
 Only in Pinas
 Pabida Ka! (2010–2011)
 Pamana
 Paradigm Chef
 Pet Ko! (2005)
 Philippine Realty TV
 Powerline with Pastor Apollo C. Quiboloy (now aired on SMNI)
 Pilipinas Got Talent (2010)
 Pinoy Big Brother Season 1 on Studio 23
 Pinoy Big Brother Celebrity Edition 1 on Studio 23
 Pinoy Big Brother Teen Edition on Studio 23
 Pinoy Big Brother Season 2 on Studio 23
 Pinoy Big Brother Celebrity Edition 2 on Studio 23
 Pinoy Big Brother Double Up: Primetime Weekends
 Pinoy Big Brother Double Up: Raw Daily Exclusives on Studio 23
 Pinoy Big Brother Teen Clash 2010: Live Feeds (2010)
 Pinoy Dream Academy on Studio 23
 Pinoy Dream Academy season 2 Live Streaming
 Pinoy Fear Factor: Special Edition
 Pinoy Sports Idols
 Pinoy T.A.L.K.
 Points of View
 Promdi Chef
 Punchtime
 Quick-E (2009–2010)
 Radyo Patrol Balita Alas-Siyete (2010–2011)
 Reality World
 Rivermaya: Bagong Liwanag (2007)
 Royal Tru Orange Kulitada in Dopple Trouble (2013)
 Rush TV: Atin 'to! (2007–2008)
 S.O.C.O. (Scene of the Crime Operatives)
 Sabado Boys
 Sabong TV 
 Sagupaan
 Samsung NCAA College Hoops
 Samsung UAAP Sports Center
 San Miguel Purefoods: Kwentong Kusina, Kwentong Buhay (2013)
 SBX: Super Barkadahan Exclusive
 Sel-J Sports: Motorcross TV
 Sine'skwela
 Slipstream
 Sparkada Trip (together with Chevrolet, 2011)
 Spirits
 Sports Bites (2010–2011)
 Sports Kidz
 Sports Report
 Sports TV
 Sports U (2011)
 Star Cinema Presents (2013)
 Stoplight TV
 Strangebrew
 Studio 23 Presents
 Sunday LBO
 Sunday Night Blockbusters
 Super Inggo (2012–2013)
 Supermodel
 T.A.G. Show
 Tablescapes... Life on a Plate
 Taekwondo TV (2006–2010)
 TalkActive TV with Kate Galang Coseteng
 Tanduay Rhum On The Rock
 Team Explorer
The Explorer
 This is Life with Cory Quirino
 Thumbs Up!
 Thunderbird Sabong Nation (2013–2014)
 TM Rapublika Battle (2012–2013)
 Travel Time
 UAAP on Studio 23 (2000–2014)
 Men's Basketball (Seniors & Juniors)
 Women's Basketball
 Men's Football
 Men's Volleyball
 Women's Volleyball
 Men's Softball/Baseball
 Badminton
 Tennis
 Us Girls (2006–2012)
 Usapang Lalake (2010–2012)
 Vice Ink
 Wazzup Wazzup (2004–2007)
 WCG TV
 Welcome Home
 What Would You Do?
 Where's Tony?
 Why Not! (2010–2013)
 The Word Exposed with Luis Antonio Cardinal Tagle (2011–2014)
 Value Vision (1996–2005)
 WOW - What's on Weekend
 The Wrap (2010–2011)
 XXX: Exklusibong, Explosibong, Exposé
 Y Speak (2005–2010)
 Yamaha SZ16 Adventure Challenge (2013)
 Yamaha Yey! (2010–2011)

Foreign defunct shows

American 

 24
 The 4400
 7th Heaven
 90210 (Seasons 1 & 2)
 Accidentally on Purpose
 The Agency
 Alias (2003–2013)
 The Amazing Race (Seasons 3-18) (2003–2011)
 America's Next Top Model (Cycles 1-4)
 Andromeda
 Angel
 Are You Afraid of the Dark?
 Armor of God
 The Bachelor
 The Bachelorette
 Batman
 Baywatch (seasons 6–11)
 Bette
 Beverly Hills, 90210
 Bewitched
 The Big Easy
 Born Free
 Boston Common
 Boston Public
 Brooklyn South
 Brothers & Sisters (Seasons 1 to 4)
 Buffy the Vampire Slayer
 Castle (Season 1)
 The Century
 Charmed
 Cheerleader Nation
 Combat Missions
 The Contender
 Criminal Minds (Seasons 1 & 2)
 CSI: Crime Scene Investigation  (Seasons 1 to 11)
 D.E.A.
 Dark Angel
 Dark Skies
 Dating Game
 Dawson's Creek (1998–2005)
 Days of Our Lives
 Desperate Housewives
 Dirty Sexy Money
 The District
 The Doctors
 Early Edition
 EZ Streets
 Fallen
 Famous Crime Scene
 Fantasy Island
 Fastlane
 Fear Itself
 FightBox
 Fist of Zen (2012)
 Flash Forward
 Flash Gordon
 Flipper
 Frasier (2008)
 Future Quest
 Ghost Hunters
 Ghost Whisperer
 Gilmore Girls
 Goosebumps
 The Green Hornet
 Grey's Anatomy (Seasons 1 to 8)
 Hang Time
 Harper's Island
 Highlander
 I Dream of Jeannie
 Inside Edition
 Jack & Bobby
 Jack & Jill
 Joey
 The Journey of Allen Strange
 Just Shoot Me!
 Justice
 The Key Of David
 Kid Nation
 Kindred the Embraced
 Kyle XY
 Las Vegas
 Late Show with David Letterman
 Legend of the Seeker
 Life As We Know It
 Living With Fran
 Lost
 The Lost Room'
 Love Boat: The Next Wave Mad About You Meet the Marks Melrose Place Missing Monster Jam Murphy Brown MTV Asia Murder My So Called Life The Nanny (1996-2001)
 NCIS NCIS: Los Angeles (Seasons 1 to 3)
 Newlywed Game Night Visions Night Stand with Dick Dietrick Nitro Circus (2012)
 No Ordinary Family Northern Exposure Nowhere Man NUMB3RS Off The Map Once Upon a Time (Season 1)
 Oprah The Others Party Of Five Pearl Pinks All Out Playing It Straight Point Pleasant Popular Power Rangers series Power Rangers: Mystic Force Power Rangers: Operation Overdrive Power Rangers: Jungle Fury Power Rangers: RPM Power Rangers: Samurai Power Rangers: Zeo Primetime Crime Private Practice Reaper ReGenesis Reel Deal (Movie in the Making)
 Relativity Revenge (2013–2014)
 The River Rules of Engagement Samantha Who? Savannah Saved by the Bell Scandal (2013–2014)
 Scrubs The Secret World of Alex Mack She's Got the Look (Season 1)
 Smallville (2002–2010)
 Smart Guy Snoops Something So Right Spin City Stacked Stargate: Atlantis Sunset Beach Supernatural (Seasons 1 to 6)
 Survivor (Borneo to Cook Islands)
 The Swan Thieves The Three Stooges Timecop Time of Your Life Top Of The Pops Tru Calling The Twilight Zone Two and a Half Men Two of a Kind U.C. Undercover Ugly Betty USA High Vanished Veronica's Closet The Voice (US; Season 2)
 Wasteland The West Wing Will & Grace Wishbone World's Craziest Videos World's Wildest Police Videos Worst Week The X Factor (Seasons 1-3)
 The X-Files Young AmericansBritish
 Doctor Who Mr. Bean (1996–1997, 2003–2005)
 Top Gear Asian 

 Asia's Next Top Model (Season 1) (2012–2013; moved to TV5 in 2014 and then GMA Network in 2015; returned to TV5 in 2016)
 The Biggest Loser Asia Boys Over Flowers Butterfly Fly Fly Chu, Chu, My Daddy Dream Dream High Fireworks Football Asia Forbidden Love Four Sisters Green Rose Heartstrings He's Beautiful Honey and Clover Hot Shot I Am Legend I Survived a Japanese Game Show It Started with a Kiss The Kitchen Musical (2011)
 KO One Love at First Fight Love in the City Lovers Marry Me, Mary! Masked Rider Ryuki Mischievous Princess Miss No Good My Girl My Girlfriend is a Gumiho My Princess Only You Perfect Match Precious Time Prince Hours Princess Hours Princess Lulu Rolling Love Romantic Princess Save The Last Dance For Me Smile Again Something About 1% Spring Waltz Summer x Summer Sungkyunkwan Scandal Sunshine of Love They Kiss Again Three Brothers Three Dads with One Mommy The Truth Ultraman Max Which Star Are You From White Tower Why Why Love The X-FamilyAnimated defunct series

Western animation, Chinese animation and Japanese anime

 6teen (Season 1 only)
 Action Man A.T.O.M.: Alpha Teens on Machines The Adventures of Peter Pan (2007 redubbed)
 Akazukin Cha Cha (2007 redubbed)
 Akuei & Gatchinpo Angelic Layer Ani-Yoko Astro Boy Bakegyamon Barkada Trip The Batman Batman: The Animated Series Batman Beyond Beyblade series
 Beyblade Beyblade G-Revolution Beyblade V-Force Blood Plus Blue Dragon Casper Chaotic Cinderella Cooking Master Boy Cuore Dear Boys Dexter's Laboratory Digimon series
 Digimon Adventures Digimon Frontier Digimon Savers (also known as Digimon Data Squad)
 Digimon Tamers Dragon Booster Duel Masters Eureka Seven Eyeshield 21 (Seasons 1 & 2)
 Fairy Musketeers Fairy Tail (2011–2013) transferred to GMA Network
 Fairy Tale Police District Fantastic Children Fantastic Four Futurama Galaxy Racers Gallery Fake Get Backers Gun X Sword Gundam Seed Gundam Seed Destiny Gunparade March Hey Joel His & Her Circumstances (known as Tales at North Hills High)
 The Harveytoons Show Hoyt n' Andy's Sportsbender Huckleberry Finn Monogatari (known as The Adventures of Huck Finn, 1994 version)
 Huntik: Secrets & Seekers InuYasha Invasion America Justice League Justice League Unlimited Kiba Kirarin Revolution Les Misérables: Shōjo Cosette Little Amadeus Little Women Looney Tunes (2012–2014)
 MÄR (Season 1 only)
 Marcelino Pan y Vino MetaJets Mina and Porfy Monster Allergy Monster by Mistake Mr. Bean: The Animated Series (2003–2006)
 My Bride Is a Mermaid transferred to GMA Network
 Negima! (the XEBEC version)
 Negima!? (the SHAFT version)
 Night Hood No Basket Odd Job Jack Paprika (Film) Postman Pat Princess Resurrection transferred to TV5
 Pucca Rave Master Reborn! (2011–2013)
 Robin Hood no Daibōken Samurai X (2011–2013)
 Sakura Wars Samurai Deeper Kyo School Rumble (Seasons 1 & 2)
 Si Mary at Ang Lihim ng Hardin Skyland Snow White Soul Eater Spider-Man  (1994)
 Supa Strikas Superman: The Animated Series Swirl Fighter Teen Titans Teenage Mutant Ninja Turtles Teenage Mutant Ninja Turtles: Fast Forward transferred to TV5
 Thomas & Friends (Season 12)
 Transformers: Cybertron Winx Club (Season 3)
 W.I.T.C.H. Wolverine and the X-Men The Wrong Coast X-Men: The Animated Series X-Men: Evolution Xiaolin Showdown You're Under Arrest (Season 1; incomplete)
 Yu-Gi-Oh! Duel Monsters Yu-Gi-Oh! Duel Monsters GX (Season 1)
 Zenki Zoids: GenesisNickelodeon
 The Adventures of Jimmy Neutron: Boy Genius**
 Back at the Barnyard CatDog*
 Catscratch Chalkzone*
 Danny Phantom*
 Dora the Explorer* (2013)
 Rocko's Modern Life*
 Rugrats (2001-2004)
 SpongeBob SquarePants** (2004–2006)
 Wonder Pets (2010–2014)
 
(*) - With Nickelodeon on Studio 23 Block and dubbed in Tagalog-language audio

(**) - Now on ABS-CBN

Sports shows and specials

 10th IDBF World Dragon Boat Championship (October 2011)
 14th IAAF World Championship Moscow (August 2013)
 16th Asian Women's Volleyball Championship (2012)
  2005 Southeast Asian Games (November 27 – December 5, 2005)
 2007 Boxing World Cup (Philippines vs. Mexico)
 2011 French Open Finals Highlights (July 1, 2011)
 2011 Southeast Asian Games: Lakas Pinas (November 11–22, 2011) (with AKTV on IBC)
 2013 Asian Youth Games (August 27, 2013)
 2013 Southeast Asian Games (only aired men's basketball, women's football and boxing events)
 ABS-CBN Sports presents Top Rank Boxing
 AFC Champions League Highlights (September 2013)
 AFC President's Cup
 AFF Suzuki Cup/Long Teng Cup/Kia Rio Cup (only aired Philippine Azkals matches)
 Asian Indoor and Martial Arts Games (July 3, 11, 2013)
 Asian 5 Nations Rugby (April 15, 18, 21, 25–27, 2012) (only aired Philippine Volcanoes matches)
 Bernard Hopkins vs. Winky Wright (July 23, 2007)
 Cobra Energy Drink Ironman 70.3 Philippines (2011–2013)
 Davis Cup Highlights (April 2013)
 Demolition Day: Nonito Donaire, Jr. vs. Jorge Arce Fight (December 17, 2012)
 Dream Cup: Philippine Azkals vs. LA Galaxy (December 3, 2011)
 2013 FIFA Confederations Cup (June 15–30, 2013)
 2013 FIFA U-20 World Cup (June 21 – July 13, 2013)
 FIFA World Cup 2010 (June 13 – July 12, 2010)(licensed broadcaster, together with Balls)
 FilOil Flying V Hanes Premier Pre-Season Cup
 FIVB Volleyball World Cup (2012–2013)
 Football Asia
 French Open (tennis)
 Homecoming: Oscar De La Hoya vs. Steve Forbes (May 4, 2008)
 ICTSI Aboitiz Invitational (September 13, 2013)
 ICTSI Canlubang Golf Invitational (June 7, 2011)
 ICTSI Orchard Golf Championship (2011)
 ICTSI Philippine Open (February 12, 2012)
 ICTSI Ryder Cup (July 5, 2012)
 ICTSI The Country Club Invitational and Pro-Am (March 15, 2013)
 Ilog Pasig Basketball Benefit Game (November 20, 2012)
 Invasion (Philippines vs. the World) (2008)
 JBet Queens Cup: Europe vs. Asia (2013)
 J-League Highlights
 Kapamilya All-Star Basketball Game (October 2013)
 Kapamilya All-Star Volleyball Game (October 2013)
 Kopiko 3-in-1 Supercross Series 2013 (May 26, 2013)
 Laban Na Banal Boxing Coverage (July 26, 2008)
 MBA Games (1998–2001)
 MLS (Major League Soccer) All-Stars vs Manchester United (July 25, 2011)
 Manny Pacquiao fights
 2006 vs. Erik Morales II
 2006 vs. Óscar Larios
 2006 vs. Erik Morales III
 The Masters (2002–2013) (under Fox Sports Asia)
 NBA on Studio 23 (2011–2014)
 NBA Action (2011–2014)
 Real NBA
 NBA All Star Weekend (2011–2013)
 NBA Playoffs (2011–2013)
 NBA Finals (2011–2013)
 NBA Global Games Philippines: Houston Rockets vs. Indiana Pacers (October 10, 2013) (with Basketball TV)
 NCAA Games (Basketball & Volleyball) (2002–2011)
 NFL on Studio 23 (1996–2000)
 NFL Super Bowl (1996–1998)
 Number One-Numero Uno: Floyd Mayweather, Jr. vs. Juan Manuel Márquez (September 20, 2009)
 Philippine Azkals: Football Friendly Games (2011-2013)
 Philippine Basketball Association (2011) (under Basketball TV)
 PBL on Studio 23 (2003–2007)
 Philippine Collegiate Champions League (2009–2014)
 Philippine Football Peace Cup (2012–2013)
 Pinoy Pride Fights (2010–2013)
  Rambulan sa Macau 2: Milan Melindo vs. Juan Francisco Estrada Fight (July 28, 2013)
 A Run for the Pasig River (2009-2013)
 Solaire Philippines Open (April 24, 2013)
 Taobao World Mixed Doubles (August 2012)
 United Football League (2011)
 US Open (golf) (2011–2013) (under Fox Sports Asia)
 US Open (tennis) (2008–2013)
 UAAP Game of the Week (2012)
 UAAP/NCAA Bantay Bata All Stars Basketball Games (2005–2011)
 UAAP/NCAA Opening Ceremonies (1998–2013)
 UAAP Streetdance Competition and Closing Ceremonies (2011–2014)
 UEFA Champions League (2012–2014)
 UEFA Europa League (2012–2013)
 UEFA Magazine Show
 UEFA Super Cup (2013)
 UFC: Ultimate Fighting Championship (2005–2013)
 UFC Fight Nights
 UFC on Fuel TV/FX/Fox
 UFC Mayhem
 UFC Ultimate Insider
 UFC Countdown Primers
 UFC Unleashed
 UFC Wired
 UFC 20th Anniversary Special (December 2013)
 The Ultimate Fighter
 Vaseline Men Xterra Off Road Triatlon (2012–2013)
 WBC Welterweight Championship: Floyd Mayweather, Jr. vs. Ricky Hatton (December 9, 2007)
 WWE shows
 WWE NXT (2011–2014)
 WWE Raw (2011–2014)
 WWE Superstars (2011–2014)
 WWE pay-per-views
 WWE: Battleground
 WWE: Elimination Chamber
 WWE: Extreme Rules
 WWE: Hell in a Cell 
 WWE: Money in the Bank
 WWE: Night of Champions
 WWE: No Way Out
 WWE: Over The Limit
 WWE: Payback
 WWE: Royal Rumble
 WWE: SummerSlam
 WWE: Survivor Series
 WWE: Tables, Ladders and Chairs
 WWE: WrestleMania
 Welcome to the Future: Donaire vs. Vasquez, Jr., Chavez vs. Rubio (February 5, 2012)
 The World Awaits: Oscar De La Hoya vs. Floyd Mayweather, Jr. (May 6, 2007)
 World Featherweight Championship: Yuriokis Gamboa vs. Jorge Solis (March 31, 2011) 
 Yalin World 10-Ball Women's Championship (2012–2013)
 Z Gorres vs. Luis Melendez (November 15, 2009)

Studio 23 TV specials

 23 Gifts for Christmas: A Studio 23 Christmas Special (December 2009)
 Krismas Barkada Karoling: A Studio 23 Christmas Special (December 24, 2009)
 37th Metro Manila Film Festival Parade of the Stars (December 24, 2011)
 ABS-CBN Independence Day Flag Raising Ceremony (2008–2013)
 ABS-CBN News Yearender Reports (2007–2011)
 Academy Awards "The Oscars" (2007–2013)
 Celebr8: Globe Get Together Special (November–December 2000)
 Catholic Mass Media Awards
 Chief Justice on Trial: The ANC Special Coverage (January–May 2012)
 Chinese New Year Countdown Special Live at the Quirino Grandstand (2010–2013)
 Dance World Cup Latin Philippines (December 17, 2011)
 DZMM SilveRadyo: The Concert (January 1, 2012)
 Game On: The Chevrolet Sonic Celebrity Challenge (April 6 & 13, 2013; together with Chevrolet)
 Guys Choice Awards (2010)
 Grammy Awards (2006–2009)
 Halalan: The ABS-CBN Election Coverage (1998, 2001, 2004, 2007, 2010, 2013)
 Harapan 2013: The Senatorial Debates (April 21, 28, 2013)
 Holy Week/Holiday Movie Marathon (1997–2013)
 Inauguration of President Noynoy Aquino (June 30, 2010; together with ABS-CBN News)
 iTunes Festival (December 24 & December 31, 2012 – 2013)
 KBP Golden Dove Awards (2008–2011)
 The Making of the Sound of Music (April 1, 2012)
 The Making of 1DOL/1DOL 1st Episode (September 6, 2010)
 Melason Uber in Love (February 2010)
 Michael Buble: Home for the Holidays (December 22, 2012)
 Misa Aguinaldo/Misa de Gallo (2009–2012)
 Miss Cebu 2014 (January 15, 2014; aired only on Visayas & Mindanao stations)
 MNET Asia Music Awards (2011–2013; together with Myx)
 Miss Universe (2008–2012)
 Mr. and Ms. Hannah's Beach Resort Eco Tourism Ambassadors Pageant (June 13, 2013)
 Mutya ng Pilipinas 2011 (December 11, 2011)
 Myx Music Awards (2006–2013)
 National Cheerdancing Championship (moved to Fox Sports Asia)
 National Quiz Bee (2008–2013)
 Once in a Lifetime: The Rock vs. John Cena Documentary Special (April 3, 2012)
 Pilipinas Got Talent Season 1 Finals (June 19, 2010)
 Primetime Emmy Awards (2004–2013)
 Rey Misterio sa Pinas (August 5, 2012)
 Round 2 For Keeps: Nonito & Rachel Donaire Wedding TV Special (January 28, 2012)
 Sa Dagat at Bundok: The Philippine Biodiversity Expedition (April 19, 2012)
 Sagwan ng Tagumpay: PHL Dragon Boat Team documentary (August 1, 2011)
 Salamat, Tito Dolphy News Coverage (July 2012)
 Samsung UAAP Cheerdance Competition (2002–2013)
 Slimmer's World Miss Bikini Philippines 2013 (May 16, 2013)
 Search For SM Little Stars (2010–2013)
 State of the Nation Address (carrying ANC)
 Tambayan OPM Awards 2012 (July 13, 2012)
 Teen Choice Awards (2002–2012)
 Tournament of Roses Parade (2008-2014, on New Year's Day)
 UFC sa ABS-CBN: Mark Munoz: The Filipino Fighter (June–July 2012)
 U2 360 Concert Live at the Rose Bowl (May 19, 2010)
 Victoria's Secret Fashion Show 2010 (September 6, 2011)
 The Voice of Mcdonald's Grand Finals (June 14, 2013)
 Y Speak's Campaigns 2010: A Youth Leadership Forum (October 24, 2009)
 Zoren-Carmina: Always Forever, A Wedding Like No Other TV Special (December 22, 2012)

References

External links
 
 Studio 23 launches new shows

Lists of television series by network
Studio 23 original programming